The Centrist Union of Democrats for Progress (UCDP) was a parliamentary group in the French Senate.

Formed after the 1968 Senate elections, the UCDP succeeded the Popular Republicans and Democratic Centre (RPCD) group. It was composed quasi-exclusively of members of the Centre des démocrates sociaux (CDS), the Christian democratic component of the Union for French Democracy.

Alain Poher, who served twice as interim President of the Republic and long-time President of the Senate, was a member of the UCDP.

Presidents
1968–1971: André Colin
1971–1974: Roger Poudonson
1974–1976: André Fosset
1976–1983: Adolphe Chauvin

References

Political parties in France
Parliamentary groups in France